Strugar is surname. Notable people with the surname include:

George Strugar (1934–1997), American football player
Ivan Strugar (born 1974), Montenegrin kickboxer
Pavle Strugar (born 1933), Montenegrin general
Vlado Strugar (1922–2019), Serbian historian

See also
Strugari, Bacău, commune in Bacău County, Romania